Baldeh Sara (also Romanized as Baldeh Sarā; also known as Baleh Sar) is a village in Rahimabad Rural District, Rahimabad District, Rudsar County, Gilan Province, Iran. At the 2006 census, its population was 116, in 26 families.

References 

Populated places in Rudsar County